Pachydisca is a genus of fungi in the family Helotiaceae; according to the 2007 Outline of Ascomycota, the placement in this family is uncertain. The genus was first described by Jean Louis Émile Boudier in 1885.

References 

Helotiaceae